Scuticaria steelei is a species of orchid native to southern tropical America. It is the type species of the genus Scuticaria.

References 

steelei
Orchids of South America